Alex Schwazer, OMRI (born 26 December 1984), is an Italian race walker. He was the 2008 Olympic 50k walk champion. He retired during the 2012 Olympics after being disqualified for doping offences.

Biography
Schwazer was born in Sterzing, South Tyrol, in northern Italy. Schwazer won the bronze medal in the 50 km race at the 2005 World Championships in a national record time of 3:41.54 hours. At the 2007 World Championships he finished tenth in the 20 km race and won bronze again in the 50 km race (with the quickest finish ever measured on this event, of 3:37:04.08). He was the runner-up at the 2008 IAAF World Race Walking Cup and went on to win gold at the 50 km walk at the 2008 Summer Olympics, setting a new Olympic record with his time of 3:37:09.

He started his 2010 campaign with two wins on the 2010 IAAF World Race Walking Challenge circuit: first he won the 20 km at the Gran Premio Città di Lugano in an Italian record time, breaking Maurizio Damilano's 18-year-old record with a time of 1:18:23.20. Just prior to the IAAF World Race Walking Cup he won at the Coppa Città di Sesto San Giovanni. At the 2010 European Athletics Championships, he failed to finish the 50 km walk, but doubled up in the 20 km and took the silver medal behind Russia's Stanislav Emelyanov. He competed in the 20 km race at the 2011 World Championships in Athletics, but managed only ninth place.

He began 2012 in strong form. First he walked an Italian record of 1:17:30 hours to win at the Memorial Mario Albisetti 20 km walk, then he had the fourth best 50 km time of his career a week later to win at the Dudinska patdesiatka.

Doping cases
Schwazer was excluded from the 2012 Summer Olympics in London after an "adverse result" from a doping test. Schwazer said "My career is finished... I wanted to be stronger for this Olympics, I made a mistake". He announced his decision to quit athletics and described the result as the "biggest blow of my life". He was subsequently given a three-and-a-half year competition ban by the Italian National Olympic Committee in April 2013. Schwazer's girlfriend at the time of the offence, figure skater Carolina Kostner, later admitted to prosecutors in Bolzano that she had lied to inspectors from the World Anti-Doping Agency shortly before the 2012 Games when they visited her home looking for Schwazer, claiming that he was not there so he could avoid being tested. She also told the prosecutors that Schwazer slept in an altitude chamber, which is not banned by WADA but is illegal in Italy.

In May 2016, a negative doping control sample from January was re-analysed and found positive. Schwazer was informed about the positive in June, a few weeks before the Olympic Games. He appealed the case to the Court of Arbitration for Sport. On 11 August 2016 the court dismissed his appeal and imposed an 8-year period of ineligibility on him, until 7 July 2024.

On 12 June 2019 FIDAL cancelled all results achieved by the athlete starting 18 March 2012, thus also cancelling his Italian record of 1:17:30 made in Lugano on 18 March 2012.

Italian newspaper La Repubblica, however, produced a documentary with evidence, including police phone tapping, which cast serious doubt on the treatment of Schwazer and strongly suggests that the 2016 doping control sample was tampered with. The documentary suggests that the real target was Schwazer's trainer since 2015, Sandro Donati, former trainer of the Italian sprint team, whistle-blower and a long term critic both of doping and corruption in sport, who had uncovered Italian state sponsored cheating in the 1980s.

On 17 March 2020 the doping ban was confirmed by the federal tribunal of Lausanne after a rejected appeal by Schwazer. As of October 2020 a case was ongoing at the Court of Bolzano.

La Repubblica published a longform article on this affair, outlining the dubious aspects of this doping offence that could be a plot.

The criminal file for 2016 doping charges against Schwazer was filed by an Italian court on 18 February 2021, accusing WADA for samples tampering. However, his eight-year ban remains in place, because the WADA rejected all accusations and the Lausanne federal court finally refused to suspend the ongoing disqualification.

Schwazer hence wasn't eligible to take part in Tokyo 2020 Olympic (postponed in 2021 due to COVID-19 pandemic).

See also
Italian records in athletics
Italian all-time lists: 20 km walk
Italian all-time lists: 50 km walk

References

External links

 
 
 

1984 births
Living people
Sportspeople from Sterzing
Italian male racewalkers
Athletes (track and field) at the 2008 Summer Olympics
Olympic athletes of Italy
Olympic gold medalists for Italy
World Athletics Championships athletes for Italy
Athletics competitors of Centro Sportivo Carabinieri
Doping cases in athletics
Italian sportspeople in doping cases
World Athletics Championships medalists
European Athletics Championships medalists
Medalists at the 2008 Summer Olympics
Olympic gold medalists in athletics (track and field)
Germanophone Italian people
21st-century Italian people